The Philippines participated in the 2017 Asian Indoor and Martial Arts Games in Ashgabat, Turkmenistan from 17-27 September 2017.

The Philippine delegation competed in 17 out of 21 sports in the 10-day event, with over 105 athletes joining the games, led by 2016 Summer Olympics silver medalist Hidilyn Diaz. Diaz was initially announced as the country's flagbearer but she declined. The chef de mission of the delegation was Monsour Del Rosario.

At the end of the games, the Philippine team brought home 30 medals, including two jiu-jitsu golds, the best performance the country has ever performed in the history of Asian Indoor and Martial Arts Games.

The country also competed at electronic sports which was a demonstration event participating in all four video games contested. The country secured a bronze medal in Dota 2.

Medalists

Gold

Silver

Bronze

Demonstration sport
Earned medal in a demonstration sport is not counted in the Medal Haul.

Multiple

Medal summary

By sports

References

External links
Philippines at the 2017 Asian Indoor and Martial Arts Games
Nations at the 2017 Asian Indoor and Martial Arts Games
Asian Indoor and Martial Arts Games
Philippines at the Asian Indoor Games